Dermogenys is a genus of viviparous halfbeaks. They are widely distributed in fresh and brackish water in South and Southeast Asia, ranging from India to the Philippines and Greater Sundas. Males tend to be more brightly coloured and are well known for being aggressive towards one another. The wrestling halfbeak, D. pusilla, is widely used in Asia as fighting animals upon which wagers are placed (see Siamese fighting fish). Both sexes have lower jaws (mandibles) that are much longer than the upper ones, and from this comes the "halfbeak" name.

Dermogenys feed extensively on small insects, either in the form of aquatic larvae or as flying insects that have fallen onto the surface of the water. They are important predators on insects such as mosquitoes, so play a role in controlling malaria.

Reproduction

Dermogenys are live-bearing fish that practise internal fertilisation. The male is equipped with a gonopodium-like anal fin known as an andropodium that delivers sperm into the female. The gestation period is about one month. The exact mode of reproduction ranges from ovoviviparity through to viviparity (see section on reproduction in the Zenarchopteridae article). About ten embryos are developed at any one time, but at birth, these are fairly large (around ) compared with other fish of this size.

Species
There are currently 12 recognized species in this genus:
 Dermogenys bispina A. D. Meisner & Collette, 1998
 Dermogenys brachynotopterus (Bleeker, 1853)
 Dermogenys bruneiensis A. D. Meisner, 2001
 Dermogenys burmanica Mukerji, 1935
 Dermogenys collettei A. D. Meisner, 2001
 Dermogenys orientalis (M. C. W. Weber, 1894)
 Dermogenys palawanensis A. D. Meisner, 2001
 Dermogenys pusilla Kuhl & van Hasselt, 1823 (Wrestling halfbeak)
 Dermogenys robertsi A. D. Meisner, 2001	
 Dermogenys siamensis Fowler, 1934
 Dermogenys sumatrana (Bleeker, 1854)
 Dermogenys vogti Brembach, 1982

See also
Halfbeak
Live-bearing aquarium fish

References

FishBase entry for Dermogenys
Report on keeping and breeding halfbeaks

Further reading
 Scott, Peter (1997): Livebearing Fishes, Tetra Press, 
 Forward Jr, R. B., & Waterman, T. H. (1973). Evidence forE-vector and light intensity pattern discrimination by the teleost Dermogenys. Journal of Comparative Physiology, 87(2), 189-202 (extract).

 
Zenarchopteridae
Live-bearing fish
Viviparous fish
Fishkeeping
Taxa named by Johan Conrad van Hasselt